Janine Duvitski (born Christine Janine Drzewicki; 28 June 1952) is a British actress, known for her roles in the BBC television sitcom series Waiting for God, One Foot in the Grave and Benidorm. Duvitski first came to national attention in the play Abigail's Party, written and directed in 1977 by Mike Leigh.

Personal life
Duvitski was born in Nottingham to a Polish father and an English mother. She attended Nottingham Girls' High School, then a direct grant grammar school.

She trained at East 15 Acting School in Essex. She has four children, Jack, Albert, Ruby, and Edith Bentall, with her actor husband Paul Bentall. Her youngest daughter Edith is the lead singer of the band FOURS.

Career

Television
Shortly after leaving drama school, Duvitski was given a couple of small roles in television dramas but had no agent, and placed an advert in the 'Spotlight' agency catalogue with a photograph. As a result she was approached by the BBC to test for a play about incest, entitled BBC2 Playhouse: Diane (1975). Although she was in her early 20s the part was that of a 13-year-old girl but her audition was sufficiently convincing to win her the role. The door thus opened to her for more TV and stage roles and, whilst she was appearing in 'Don Juan' at Hampstead Theatre, London, she was spotted by Mike Leigh who offered her the part of Angie in the stage production of Play for Today: Abigail's Party (1977), which she repeated in the television version. Duvitski's principal television credits include the roles of Jane Edwards in Waiting for God (1990–1994), Pippa Trench in One Foot in the Grave (1990–2000), and Jacqueline Stewart in Benidorm (2007–2018). In the BBC's Vanity Fair she played Mrs Crawley. She has also appeared on Lily Savage's Blankety Blank.

She has also appeared in the one-off production of Blue Remembered Hills by Dennis Potter, as well as in episodes of Foyle's War ("Fifty Ships"), Brush Strokes, Cowboys, Citizen Smith, Minder, Midsomer Murders (1998), My Family, Man About the House, The Georgian House, The New Statesman, The Black Stuff by Alan Bleasdale, The Knowledge, Z-Cars, The Worst Week of My Life, Little Dorrit, Still Open All Hours and, in 2013, as Emily Scuttlebutt in the CBeebies show Old Jack's Boat.

In 2015 Duvitski starred in the BBC sitcom Boy Meets Girl. In 2017 she appeared as Mrs Leydon, the Chapel assistant, in BBC's mockumentary Hospital People.

Films
Duvitski had a small role opposite Laurence Olivier and Donald Pleasence in Dracula (1979), and appeared in the 1980 rock music film Breaking Glass. She also appeared in Michael Crichton's The First Great Train Robbery (1978), The Madness of King George (1994), About a Boy (2002), The New World (2005) and Angel (2007).

Theatre
Duvitski first came to national attention in Abigail's Party, written and directed in 1977 by Mike Leigh. The play opened in April 1977 at the Hampstead Theatre, returning after its initial run in the summer of 1977, with a total of 104 performances. A suburban comedy of manners, the play is a satire on the aspirations and tastes of the new middle class that had emerged in Britain in the 1970s. In November 1977 an abridged version of the play, lasting 104 minutes, was recorded as a BBC Play for Today. Duvitski plays Angela, a nurse, wife of Tony Cooper.

Her theatre career has also included productions at UK's National Theatre, Young Vic and Royal Shakespeare Company.

In 2007 she appeared on stage in the revival of English National Opera's On the Town. The production, which also included veteran British comic actress June Whitfield, saw Duvitski give a "touching comic account of Lucy Schmeeler, Hildy's homely roommate".

Duvitski played the Vegetable Fairy in the 2017 Sunderland Empire Theatre pantomime Jack and the Beanstalk. In 2019 she played Mummy Bear in Goldilocks and the Three Bears at the London Palladium, and later appeared as Fairy Moonbeam in the pantomime Sleeping Beauty at Sheffield's Lyceum theatre.

Filmography

Television

Film

References

External links

1952 births
Living people
Actresses from Nottinghamshire
Alumni of East 15 Acting School
English people of Polish descent
English film actresses
English television actresses
English stage actresses
People educated at Nottingham Girls' High School
People from Nottingham
20th-century English actresses
21st-century English actresses